Acridocera is a genus of beetles in the family Cerambycidae, containing a single species, Acridocera ziczac. It was described by Karl Jordan in 1903.

References

Acmocerini
Beetles described in 1903
Monotypic Cerambycidae genera